Karahal Nauabad  is a village in Kapurthala district of Punjab State, India. The village is administered by a Sarpanch, who is an elected representative.

Demography 
According to the report published by Census India in 2011, Karahal Nauabad has 130 houses with the total population of 662 persons of which 339 are male and 323 females. Literacy rate of Karahal Nauabad is 75.58%, lower than the state average of 75.84%.  The population of children in the age group 0–6 years is 56 which is 8.46% of the total population. Child sex ratio is approximately 1000, higher than the state average of 846.

Population data

References

External links
  Villages in Kapurthala
 Kapurthala Villages List

Villages in Kapurthala district